Dendropsophus luteoocellatus is a species of frog in the family Hylidae.
It is endemic to Venezuela.
Its natural habitats are subtropical or tropical moist lowland forests, subtropical or tropical moist montane forests, freshwater marshes, pastureland, rural gardens, heavily degraded former forest, urban sewer systems and ponds.

References

luteoocellatus
Frogs of South America
Amphibians of Venezuela
Endemic fauna of Venezuela
Amphibians described in 1927
Taxa named by Jean Roux
Taxonomy articles created by Polbot